Trybanes was a town of ancient Caria. The town was possibly the same as Tarbanes (Ταρβανῆς).
 
Its site is unlocated.

References

Populated places in ancient Caria
Former populated places in Turkey
Lost ancient cities and towns
Members of the Delian League